Isle of Man Railway No.1 Sutherland is a 2-4-0 Side Tank steam locomotive built in 1873 for the Isle of Man Railway (IMR) at Gorton Foundry by Beyer Peacock & Company. It was one of three locomotives ordered for the IMR and was put back in service after being withdrawn in 1998 for the Steam 125 Celebrations it was taken out of service in 2003 due to Sutherland's age. As of 2020 she is om display in the Isle of Man railway museum in the place of IMR No.16 Mannin after having a lengthy restoration.

History 
Sutherland was built for the Isle of Man Railway as their number one and arrived in a trio the other two locomotives being No.2 Derby and No.3 Pender. Sutherland was named after the Duke of Sutherland the company director at the time. When Sutherland arrived she was assigned the first train on the new railway which ran on the 1st of July in 1873. It remained in service (only being taken out of service for repairs in 1921 to 1922) as a shunter at Douglas until 1964 when it was withdrawn from service. In 1967 the Marquess of Alisa took over the operations on the railway and Sutherland was painted up in a "Spring Green" Livery (inspired by LNER Apple Green) and was put on display at St John's. It was then the jewel in the crown in the Isle of Man Railway Museum when it opened in 1975. It was then brought back to Douglas in October 1997 where inspections were carried out to see if it was possible to bring it back to operation. Sutherland managed to get restored in time for the 125th Anniversary of the Isle of Man Railway operating steam motive power. Sutherland was using No.8 Fenella's boiler in order to operate. It occasionally pulled trains on the Manx Electric Railway and was later repainted Indian Red and in 2003 was withdrawn from service with the boiler being lifed back into the frames of Fanella. Following being put in storage and a static restoration it was put on display in 2020 in the Isle of Man Railway Museum in the place that No.16 Mannin had formerly been displayed.

See also 

 Isle of Man Railway Locomotives
 Isle of Man Railway
 Isle of Man Railway Museum
 Rail Transport on the Isle of Man

References 

Narrow gauge steam locomotives
Preserved steam locomotives
Isle of Man Railway
Individual locomotives of Great Britain